Aberdeen Historic District is a national historic district located at Aberdeen, Moore County, North Carolina. The district encompasses 101 contributing buildings, 1 contributing site, and 2 contributing structures in the town of Aberdeen.  It was developed between 1880 and 1940 and includes notable examples of Queen Anne, Classical Revival, and Bungalow / American Craftsman style architecture.  Located in the district is the separately listed John Blue House.  Other notable buildings include the Postmaster's House (c. 1880), Aberdeen and Asheboro Railroad Building (c. 1906), Page Memorial Library (1907), (former) Union Station (1906), Aberdeen and Rockfish Railroad Building (1904), Bank of Aberdeen, Page Memorial United Methodist Church (1913), (former) Bethesda Presbyterian Church (1906-1907), and Faith Presbyterian Church (c. 1890).

It was added to the National Register of Historic Places in 1989.

References

Historic districts on the National Register of Historic Places in North Carolina
Queen Anne architecture in North Carolina
Neoclassical architecture in North Carolina
Buildings and structures in Moore County, North Carolina
National Register of Historic Places in Moore County, North Carolina
1989 establishments in North Carolina